Kariavattom is an area of Trivandrum city the capital of Kerala, India. Trivandrum International Stadium the largest international stadium of Kerala is situated in Karyavattom.

Geography
(കാര്യവട്ടം) is approximately 14 km north of Thiruvananthapuram on NH 47, between Pangappara (പാങ്ങപ്പാറ) and Kazhakuttam (കഴക്കൂട്ടം). It is about 3 km from Sreekariyam (ശ്രീകാര്യം) and 3.5 km from Kaniyapuram (കണിയാപുരം).

According to old timers, the place got its name because the Ettuveettil Pillamar (എട്ടുവീട്ടീല്‍ പിള്ളമാര്‍) (Pillais from the 8 houses) who rebelled against the would-be Prince Marthandavarma (മാര്‍ത്താണ്ഡവര്‍മ്മ)(later King of Travancore) used to meet in a place near the Lord Ayyappa temple located near Kariavattom. It is believed that they used to sit in a circle and discuss matters of importance and hence the name Kariavattom. (Karya means matter and vattom means circle.) Another claim about the name is the Karyam in Karyavattom is attached to Karyakkar of Kazhakkoottam temple. We can find settlements of karyakkars in Sreekaryam and also Kariyam (now part of Trivandrum Corporation) which is Sree Narayana Guru's birthplace near 5 km from Kariavattom.

Postal Index Number (PIN) Code is 695581.

Education
The town is home to some of the prominent educational institutions like University of Kerala post graduate section, Govt.College, Kariavattom, Engineering College[Kerala University],University College of Engineering as well as the L.N.C.P.E Lakshmibai National College of Physical Education.

In proper Kariavattom (i.e.near Kariavattom Jn) there are three schools:  Govt. UPS, SDA School, Mar Gregorious.

Economy
Technopark, India's largest IT and electronics industrial park, is located in Kariavattom. The Trivandrum International Stadium (Greenfield Stadium) was inaugurated on 26 January 2015; it is the first stadium in the country coming up on DBOT (Design-Build- Operate and Transfer) basis.

External links

Suburbs of Thiruvananthapuram